Jethro Sheeran, known professionally as Alonestar, is a Number 1 Billboard Multi award winning musician, music producer, rapper and fashion model from Bristol, United Kingdom. He has collaborated with a number of artists, including Ed Sheeran (his cousin), Lil Wayne, Macy Gray, Royce Da 5'9", Akon, DaBaby, Freeway, Popcaan. Snoop Dogg, Michael Jackson, Rick Ross, The Game, Massive Attack, Capleton, Shatta Wale, Amy Winehouse and Trippe Redd.

Career
Formerly a model at the acclaimed Storm agency, Nevs and MOT models.

Jethro Sheeran aka Alonestar featured in a number of worldwide commercials, including Prada, Coca-Cola and Calvin Klein. He has worked as an extra as well.

In 2011 he signed with EMI and released Warrior, an EP featuring Jaja Soze, Rosie Ribbons, and the track All Falls Down featuring Ed Sheeran. In the same year he featured on 6 singles on the album Dubstep and Funky. He has featured on Ed Sheeran singles including Move On, Pause and You Need Me, I Don't Need You. Conversely Ed Sheeran has featured on Alonestar's singles including Real Life, All Falls Down, and Raise Em Up. The track Raise Em Up was featured on the Vertigo Films movie All Stars in 2013.  It was revealed in 2017 that Ed Sheeran secretly appeared in the video for Jethro's single Skyla Rain in 2010.

Jethro has written and produced three songs with Sarah Harding from Girls Aloud as well as recorded a chill step cover of Cyndi Lauper's Time after Time with plans to release in 2018.
As a music producer, Jethro executive produced all the tracks on the Bars and Melody album 143.  Hitting the number 4 position in the official UK chart.

In December 2017 he featured on the Tropical House Cruises to Jamaica compilation album alongside artists such as Ed Sheeran, Sean Paul, Sean Kingston, Lee Scratch Perry, Tim Starr, Contractor, Damian Marley and Stephen Marley. The album reached no. 1 on the Billboard Charts in February 2018.
In 2017 Sheeran produced a track that was originally made by Tupac for his brother Mopreme Shakur.

In addition to his success as a solo artist, Sheeran has collaborated with some of the very best out there, including, Massive Attack, The Game, Royce da 5’9, performed gigs with Amy Winehouse and has written and produced songs with cousin Ed. Performed in Moscow, Russia in front of 90,000 people and in December 2018 Sheerans ‘Tropical House Cruises to Jamaica’ album which included Stephen and Damien Marley, Ed Sheeran, Sean Paul, Sean Kingston, Sizzla, Cronixx and many more. The album reached No1 on the Billboard Charts in February 2018, held the spot for five weeks and didn't drop below the number five spot for a further 15 weeks.

Alonestar latest album Sunshine and Rain, produced by African producer “Herbert Skillz” released its lead “Raise em up” which hits the number one position in the UK iTunes chart and number six all genres also hitting the UK official top 40 charts amassing two million streams in one week.

Jethro has surpassed over 50,000,000 streams on Spotify.

Jethro has also had some negative press relating to an alleged threat made to a journalist over text.

Personal life
Sheeran has a daughter from an earlier relationship. She moved to Denmark with her mother after the break-up and Sheeran often visited the country to see her. He moved to Denmark on a permanent basis after meeting his Danish girlfriend on one of his visits and to be closer to his daughter in 2018. Before moving to Denmark permanently Sheeran spend time between Denmark and his home town of Bristol and London where he lived for 15 years.  

Sheeran is an avid supporter and campaigner for animal welfare, social awareness, and children charities with his website 'Raise Em Up'.

Awards

Exposure Music Awards -  Best Urban Song and Best Male Artist 2011

Discography

Albums

2010 Isophase Light  
2012 Warrior EP
2012 Arms to the Sun EP
2014 Live Hard, Love Strong EP
2015 Cornerstone  (charted no 3 iTunes)
2017 Tropical House – Cruises to Jamaica compilation (reached no 1 on the Billboard Reggae charts in February 2018 )

Singles

2010 Raise Em Up featuring Ed Sheeran
2012 Flyaway 
2012 Real Life featuring Ed Sheeran
2013 Going Home featuring Rosie Ribbons
2013 All Falls Down featuring Ed Sheeran and Rosie Ribbons
2013 Full Flame featuring Metro Man 
2017 Lovelorn featuring Rosie Ribbons and Angelo Bruschini  
2017 Outlaw featuring Tim Starr and Contractor on the Tropical House – Cruises to Jamaica Album which charted 7 on iTunes and 1 on Amazon Music

References

External links

Living people
English male singer-songwriters
English record producers
Musicians from Bristol
21st-century English singers
21st-century British male singers
Year of birth missing (living people)
British emigrants to Denmark